Loreta Hairapedian Tabrizi (Persian: لرتا هايراپتيان تبريزى) was an Iranian Armenian stage and film actress.

Biography 
Loreta was born as Loreta Hairapedian Tabrizi in 1911 in Tehran. Following a succession of roles in performances of William Shakespeare directed by Vahram Arsen Papazian, she married the well-known stage director Abdolhossein Noushin and later joined the Iran Club of Theater. There, she appeared in grand scale performances of such plays as Othello, Volpone, The Blue Bird and Gas Light. In 1933, she married Abdol Hossein Noushin. In 1953 Loreta traveled abroad together with her husband following the 1953 coup d'etát, and the couple lived in Moscow for several years, where they both entered education; Loreta entered the acting school of the Moscow State University (Moscow Art Theatre), while her husband studied for a PhD in philology at the Maxim Gorky Literature Institute. When the couple returned to Iran after several years, Loreta broke into films and made six films the first of which was The Night of Execution (Davoud Mollapour, 1970). The list includes the co-production Bride of Fortune and Ebrahim Golestan's The Mystery of The Treasure of The Valley of The Genies al well. Her only TV series was Khosrov-Mirza II (Nosrat Karimi). Loreta left Iran in 1979 together with her only son from her marriage with Noushin, and went to live in Vienna, Austria, where she died on 29 March 1998.

Filmography 
 1971 Subah-o-Shyam
 1972 The Triple Bed 
 1974 Asrar ganj dareheye jenni

Television 
 1977 Khosrow Mirza-ye dovom (TV Mini-Series)

References

External links

1911 births
1998 deaths
People from Tehran
Actresses from Tehran
Iranian film actresses
Iranian stage actresses
Iranian theatre directors
Ethnic Armenian actresses
Iranian emigrants to Austria
Iranian television actresses
Iranian expatriates in Austria
20th-century Iranian actresses
Moscow State University alumni
Moscow Art Theatre School alumni
Iranian people of Armenian descent
Austrian people of Armenian descent